Carnaval is the sixth album by Brazilian rock band Barão Vermelho, released in 1988. It's the third album with Roberto Frejat as vocalist and the final album with bassist Dé Palmeira. The album sold better than the previous two albums and it generated the hit "Pense e Dance" (Think and Dance).

Track listing 
 "Lente" (Lens)
 "Pense e Dance" (Think and Dance)
 "Não Me Acabo" (I Don't Get Wasted)
 "O Que Você Faz à Noite?" (What Do You Do at Night?)
 "Nunca Existiu Pecado" (There's Never Been Sin)
 "Como um Furacão" (Like a Hurricane)
 "Quem Me Escuta" (Who Listens to Me)
 "Selvagem" (Savage)
 "Carnaval" (Carnival)
 "Rock da Descerebração" (Brainlessness Rock)

Personnel
Barão Vermelho
 Frejat – vocals, acoustic and electric guitars
 Dé Palmeira – bass
 Guto Goffi – drums

Additional musicians
 Ronaldo Barcelos – background vocals  (2, 4, 6, 8)
 Jordão Barreto – organ on "O Que Você Faz à Noite", piano  (4, 6)
 Iuri Cunha – keyboards on "Pense e Dance"
 Léo Gandelman – alto saxophone
 Jurema and Jussara Lourenço, Zé Roberto – background vocals  (2, 6, 8) 
 Fernando Magalhães – guitars
 Peninha – percussion
 Zé Carlos – tenor saxophone
 Serginho – trombone
 Bidinho, Don Harris – trumpet

References

Barão Vermelho albums
1988 albums